New Middle Class (NCM) was a centrist Chilean political party. It was founded in 2019 by former militants of the Democratic Independent Regionalist Party (PRI) led by its former president, Eduardo Cerda, and Alejandra Bravo Hidalgo.

References

External links
 Official web site

Political parties established in 2019
Political parties disestablished in 2020
Political parties in Chile
2019 establishments in Chile
2020 disestablishments in Chile
Centrist parties in South America